The 1959 Albanian National Championship was the 22nd season of the Albanian National Championship, the top professional league for association football clubs, since its establishment in 1930.

Overview
It was contested by 8 teams, and Partizani won the championship.

League standings

Note: '17 Nëntori' is SK Tirana and 'Labinoti' is KS Elbasani

Results

References
Albania - List of final tables (RSSSF)

Kategoria Superiore seasons
1
Albania
Albania